Saint-Martial-sur-Né (literally Saint-Martial on Né) is a commune in the Charente-Maritime department in the Nouvelle-Aquitaine region in southwestern France.  The river Né, a tributary of the Charente, flows through the commune.

Population

See also
Communes of the Charente-Maritime department

References

Communes of Charente-Maritime
Arrondissement of Jonzac
Charente-Maritime communes articles needing translation from French Wikipedia